Tortilla Flats is a rural locality in the Coomalie Shire, Northern Territory, Australia. The locality is named after a farm established in 1958 by the Australian Government to conduct agricultural experiments. It was also the site of an artillery and weapons range used by Australian and US forces during the Second World War. The land surrounding the locality is sparsely populated and mainly set aside for pastoral uses.

History
During World War 2 an artillery and aerial weapons range was established to the south of the Coomalie Creek Airfield in the area now known as Tortilla Flats.

The Tortilla Flats Research Farm, originally known as the Upper Adelaide River Experiment Station operated from 1958-90 when the land was sold off to private owners. Experiments conducted here focussed on rice as a potential export crop, as well as cattle rotation techniques. Estimates based on this research in 1981 found that a land area of 45,000ha in the Adelaide River region was suited to irrigated rice production, and a potential crop yield in excess of 12,000 tonnes could be harvested annually from such activities.

Present Day
Trials involving the growing of rice crops are once again being conducted in the on private farms in the vicinity. These trials are supported by the NT Department of Resources and are investigating the potential of higher crop yields gained by growing the different varieties of rice during the dry season.

To date no successful industrial scale rice farming ventures have been undertaken in the Coomalie region or the Northern Territory.

See also
Humpty Doo

References

Populated places in the Northern Territory